The 1991–92 Virginia Cavaliers men's basketball team represented the University of Virginia during the 1991–92 NCAA Division I men's basketball season. The team was led by second-year head coach Jeff Jones, and played their home games at University Hall in Charlottesville, Virginia, as members of the Atlantic Coast Conference.

Roster

Schedule and results

|-
!colspan=9 style=| Regular Season

|-
!colspan=9 style=| ACC Tournament

|-
!colspan=9 style=| National Invitation Tournament

References

Virginia Cavaliers basketball
Virginia